NGC 87 is a diffuse, highly disorganized barred irregular galaxy, part of Robert's Quartet, a group of four interacting galaxies.

See also
 Robert's Quartet

References

External links
 NGC 87
 http://www.astro.pef.zcu.cz/

 

18340930
Barred irregular galaxies
194-8
0087
1357
Phoenix (constellation)
Robert's Quartet